Cayce is an unincorporated community in Marshall County, Mississippi, United States. Although Cayce is an unincorporated community, it has a business district and shares a ZIP code with Byhalia of 38611. The Center of Cayce lies at the junction of Cayce Road and Lee Creek Road, approximately one-half mile south of Mississippi Highway 302.

Business district
The business district in Cayce is actually three miles north of the center of town, at the junction of Cayce Road and U.S. Route 72. There is a residential district between the center of town and the business district.

Neighboring towns
Cayce is bordered by Olive Branch to the west, Piperton and Collierville, Tennessee to the north, Taska and Mount Pleasant to the east, and Victoria to the south.

Notable person
 Rufus Thomas, musician and comedian; was born here, but grew up in Memphis, Tennessee.

References

Unincorporated communities in Marshall County, Mississippi
Unincorporated communities in Mississippi